National Tertiary Route 319, or just Route 319 (or ) is a National Road Route of Costa Rica, located in the San José province.

Description
In San José province the route covers Puriscal canton (Chires district), Turrubares canton (San Pedro, San Juan de Mata, San Luis, Carara districts).

References

Highways in Costa Rica